Natasha Paremski (born May 11, 1987) is a Russian-American classical pianist.

Early life and education
Natasha Paremski was born in Moscow, Russia. She studied at the Andreyev School of Music (Детская музыкальная школа имени В.В.Андреева) in Moscow with Nina Valentinovna Malikova at the age of 4 before moving to the United States. She studied with Pavlina Dokovska at Mannes College of Music, from which she graduated in 2007. She has played with several professional orchestras, including the Los Angeles Philharmonic, the Minnesota Orchestra, the San Francisco Symphony orchestra, and the Royal Philharmonic Orchestra.

References

External links

1987 births
Living people
20th-century classical pianists
21st-century classical pianists
20th-century American pianists
21st-century American pianists
21st-century American women
20th-century American women musicians
Russian emigrants to the United States
American classical pianists
Women classical pianists
Mannes School of Music alumni
Musicians from Moscow
20th-century Russian musicians
20th-century Russian women musicians
21st-century Russian musicians
Russian women pianists
Russian classical pianists
20th-century Russian women
21st-century Russian women
21st-century American women pianists